Coincidence detector or coincidence detection can refer to:

 Coincidence circuit, a device that can detect simultaneous electric signals
 Coincidence detection in neurobiology, the detection of temporally close but spatially distributed input signals
 Coincidence Detector (app), an anti-semitic web browser extension to automatically highlight names of individuals of a Jewish background on the web.